Diseases caused by pollution, lead to the chronic illness and deaths of about 8.4 million people each year. However, pollution receives a fraction of the interest from the global community. This is in part because pollution causes so many diseases that it is often difficult to draw a straight line between cause and effect.

There are many types of pollution-related diseases, including those caused by air pollution, contaminated soil, water pollution and lacking water, sanitation and hygiene (WASH). Air pollution can be reduced.

Environmental diseases vs. pollution-related diseases 
Environmental diseases are a direct result from the environment. This includes diseases caused by substance abuse, exposure to toxic chemicals, and physical factors in the environment, like UV radiation from the sun, as well as genetic predisposition. Meanwhile, pollution-related diseases are attributed to exposure to toxins in the air, water, and soil. Therefore, all pollution-related disease are environmental diseases, but not all environmental diseases are pollution-related diseases.

Air pollution diseases 
According to the World Health Organization (WHO), air pollution is linked to 7 million premature deaths.  Here is a breakdown by the diseases air pollution causes:

Outdoor air pollution 
 40% – ischaemic heart disease
 40% – stroke
 11% – chronic obstructive  pulmonary disease
 6% - lung cancer
 3% – acute lower respiratory infections in children

Water pollution
According to the Centers for Disease Control and Prevention (CDC): "Waterborne diseases are caused by pathogenic microbes that can be directly spread through contaminated water. Most waterborne diseases cause diarrheal illness [Note: not all diseases listed below cause diarrhea]. Eighty-eight percent of diarrhea cases worldwide are linked to unsafe drinking water, inadequate sanitation or insufficient hygiene. These cases result in 1.5 million deaths each year, mostly in young children. The usual cause of death is dehydration. Most cases of diarrheal illness and death occur in developing countries because of unsafe water, poor sanitation, and insufficient hygiene. Other waterborne diseases do not cause diarrhea; instead these diseases can cause malnutrition, skin infections, and organ damage.

Waterborne diseases 

 Amoebiasis
 Buruli ulcer
 Campylobacter
 Cholera
 Cryptosporidiosis
 Cyclosporiasis
 Dracunculiasis (guinea-worm disease)
 Escherichia coli
 Fascioliasis
 Giardiasis
 Hepatitis
 Leptospirosis
 Norovirus
 Rotavirus
 Salmonella
 Schistosomiasis
 Shigellosis
 Typhoid fever

Diseases related to lack of sanitation and hygiene 

 Dermatophytosis (ringworm)
 Lymphatic filariasis
 Scabies
 Soil transmitted helminthiasis
 Trachoma

Vector-borne diseases 
 Arboviral encephalitis
 Dengue fever
 Malaria
 Onchocerciasis
 Rift Valley fever
 Yellow fever

Toxins

Lead 
Sources of lead poisoning/pollution include mining, smelting, manufacturing and recycling activities.

 Cardiovascular disease
 Cerebrovascular disease
 Chronic Kidney disease
 Hemorrhagic stroke
 Hypertensive heart disorder
 Ischemic heart disease
 Ischemic stroke
 Neurological impairment

Arsenic 
Arsenic is a naturally occurring element and can be found in food, water, or air. There are also industrial sources of arsenic, including mining and smelting. "People are exposed to elevated levels of inorganic arsenic through drinking contaminated water, using contaminated water in food preparation and irrigation of food crops, industrial processes, eating contaminated food and smoking tobacco. Long-term exposure to inorganic arsenic... can lead to chronic arsenic poisoning. Skin lesions and skin cancer are the most characteristic effects."
 Arsenicosis
 Cancers (lung, bladder, and skin)
 Cardiovascular disease 
 Chronic kidney disease
 Neurobehavioral impairment

Mercury 
 Acrodynia
 Arthritis
 Cerebellar ataxia
 Dysarthria
 Kidney and autoimmune dysfunction 
 Minamata disease
 Neurological damage
 Respiratory failure

References

Pollution-related
Diseases